The Lopocares were a conjectural group of Ancient Britons inhabiting the area around Corbridge in Northumberland, Northeast England. They may have been a sub-tribe or sept of the Brigantes.

The Lopocares are not directly attested in any records: the name is reconstructed from the name of Corbridge as given in the Ravenna Cosmography, Corielopocarium, but this appears in another Roman source — the Antonine Itinerary — in a different form as Corstopitium. The "corie-" element is interpreted either as a Celtic word *korio-, army or host or as the Latin curia, but the meaning of the name Lopocares itself is unknown.

References

Celtic Britons
History of Northumberland
Iron Age peoples of Europe
Historical Celtic peoples